Tomar, also known in English as Thomar (the ancient name of Tomar), is a city and a municipality in the Santarém district of Portugal. The town proper has a population of about 20,000.

The town of Tomar was created inside the walls of the Convento de Cristo, constructed under the orders of Gualdim de Pais, the fourth Grand Master of the Knights Templar of Portugal in the late 12th century.

Tomar was the last Templar town to be commissioned for construction and one of Portugal's historical jewels. The town was especially important in the 15th century when it was a center of Portuguese overseas expansion under Henry the Navigator, the Grand Master of the Order of Christ, successor organization to the Knights Templar in Portugal.

Geography

Tomar lies in the most fertile region of Portugal, and one of the most fertile in the whole of the Iberian Peninsula: the Ribatejo ("by the river Tagus") meadows. It is located in the district of Santarém.
The predominant landscape is agricultural, consisting of olive, pine and fig trees.

The seat of the municipality is the city of Tomar, which comprises the parishes of Santa Maria dos Olivais and São João Batista. Tomar is also the capital of the Médio Tejo (Mid-Tagus river) region.

The Nabão River cuts across what was the ancient city of Nabantia: its inhabitants are called Nabantinos.

Parishes
Administratively, the municipality is divided into 11 civil parishes (freguesias):

 Além da Ribeira e Pedreira
 Asseiceira
 Carregueiros
 Casais e Alviobeira
 Madalena e Beselga
 Olalhas 
 Paialvo
 Sabacheira
 São Pedro de Tomar
 Tomar (São João Baptista) e Santa Maria dos Olivais 
 Serra e Junceira

History

Under the modern city lies the Roman city of Sellium. After the conquest of the region from the Moors in the Portuguese Reconquista, the land was granted in 1159 as a fief to the Order of the Knights Templar. In 1160, Gualdim Pais, the Order's Grand master in Portugal and Tomar's somewhat mythical founder, laid the first stone of the Castle and Convent of the Knights Templar that would become the headquarters of the Order in Portugal.

Local traditional legends preach that the choice was for mystical reasons and by divine inspiration, and from practices  by the Grand Master of geomancy, based on exercises taken from luck and predestination. Reinforcing this magical view is the setting of the site among  a small chain of seven elevations (lugar dos sete montes), which became known as the city of seven hills, as the seven hills of Jerusalem, the seven hills of Rome or the seven columns of Constantinople.

The foral or feudal contract was granted in 1162 by the Grand Master to the people. The Templars ruled from Tomar a vast region of central Portugal which they pledged to defend from Moorish attacks and raids. Like many lords of the unpopulated former frontier region of central Portugal, the villagers were given relatively liberal conditions in comparison with those of the northern regions of Portugal, in order to attract new immigrants. Those inhabitants who could sustain a horse were obliged to pay military service in return for privileges. They were not allowed the title of Knight which was reserved to the Templars. Women were also admitted to the Order, although they did not fight.

In 1190 Abu Yusuf Yaqub al-Mansur, an Almohad caliph, and his army attacked Tomar. However the knights and their 72-year-old leader, Gualdim Pais, kept them at bay. A plaque commemorates this bloody battle at the Porta do Sangue at the Castelo Templário (Castle of Tomar).

In 1314, under pressure from the Pope Clement V, the order was  suppressed. Philip IV of France, who owed the Templars huge debts, held the pope a virtual prisoner and coerced him to suppress the order on bases of false accusations and forced confessions. The Order was suppressed in most of Europe and its holdings were to be transferred to the Knights Hospitaler. Instead, King Dinis negotiated the transfer of the Order's possessions and personnel in Portugal to a newly created Order of Christ. This Order moved in 1319 to Castro Marim, but in 1356 it returned to Tomar.

In the 15th century and thereafter, the (ordained) Grand Master of the Order was nominated by the Pope and the (lay) Master or Governor by the King, instead of being elected by the monks. Henry the Navigator was made the Governor of the Order, and it is believed that he used the resources and knowledge of the Order to succeed in his enterprises in Africa and in the Atlantic. The Order of Christ Cross was painted in the sails of the caravels that crossed the seas, and the Catholic missions in the new lands were under the authority of the Tomar clerics until 1514.

Henry, enriched by his overseas enterprises, was the first ruler to ameliorate the buildings of the Convento de Cristo since its construction by Gualdim Pais. He also ordered dams to be built to control the Nabão River and swamps to be drained. This allowed the burgeoning town to attract more settlers. Henry ordered the new streets to be designed in a rational, geometrical fashion, as they can still be seen today.

In 1438, King Duarte, who had fled Lisbon because of the Black Death, died here.

Just after 1492 with the expulsion of Jews from Spain, the town increased further with Jewish refugee artisans and traders. The very large Jewish minority dynamized the city with new trades and skills. Their experience was vital in the success of the new trade routes with Africa. The original synagogue still stands.

In the reign of Manuel I of Portugal the convent took its final form within the Manueline renaissance style. With the growing importance of the town as master of Portugal's overseas empire, the leadership of the Order was granted to the King by the Pope.

However, under pressure from the monarchs of Spain, the King soon proclaimed by edict that all the Jews remaining within the territory of Portugal would be after a short period considered Christians, although simultaneously he forbade them to leave, fearing that the exodus of Jewish men of knowledge and capital would harm Portugal's burgeoning commercial empire. Jews were largely undisturbed as nominal Christians for several decades, until the establishment of a Tribunal of the Portuguese Inquisition by the initiative of the clergy in the town. Under persecution, wealthier Jews fled, while most others were forced to convert.

Hundreds of both Jews and New Christians were arrested, tortured and about 1,000 were executed in autos da fé, in a frenzy of persecution that peaked around 1550. Many others (c. 38,000) were expropriated of their property or penance. Jewish ascendancy, more than Jewish religion, together with personal wealth determined who would be persecuted, since the expropriations reverted to the institution of the Inquisition itself. With the persecution of its merchants and professionals Tomar lost most of its relevance as a trading centre. New Christian names among the inhabitants are very common today.

In 1581 the city was the seat of the Portuguese Cortes (feudal parliament) which acclaimed the King of Spain Felipe II as Portugal's Filipe I (see Iberian Union).

During the 18th century Tomar was one of the first regions of Portugal to develop industry. In the reign of Maria I, with royal support, a textile factory of Jácome Ratton was established against the opposition of the Order. The hydraulic resources of the river Nabão were used to supply energy to this and many other factories, namely paper factories, foundries, glassworks, silks and soaps.

Tomar was occupied by the French during the Peninsular War, against which it rebelled. The Duke of Wellington, with his Portuguese and English troops, liberated the city afterwards.

In 1834 all the religious orders, including the Order of Christ, were disbanded.

International relations

Tomar is twinned with:
 
 Emden, Germany

Attractions

Tomar attracts many tourists because of its varied monuments. These include:

Castle and Convent of the Order of Christ – Unesco World Heritage Site: An ensemble of 12th to 16th century architecture and art, it is the main monument of the city and one of the most important in Portugal.
Aqueduct of Pegões – Built between 1503 and 1614 to bring water to the convent of Christ in Tomar under command of king Philip I, the aqueduct is 6 kilometers long and in places reaches a height of 30 meters. It is the biggest and most important construction of Philip I in Portugal.
Church of Santa Maria do Olival: This 13th century Gothic church was built as a burial ground for the Knights Templar and their treasure.
Synagogue of Tomar: the best preserved mediaeval synagogue of Portugal (and one of two pre-expulsion Synagogues in the country), built in the mid-15th century the Jewish community of Tomar. Since 1939 it houses the Jewish Museum Abraão Zacuto, with pieces related to Jewish history in Portugal.
Church of Saint John the Baptist (São João Baptista): The main church of Tomar is located in the main square of the town, in front of the Municipality (17th century) and a modern statue of Gualdim Pais. The church was built between the 15th and 16th centuries. In addition to its architectural interest it is noted for several panels painted in the 1530s by one of Portugal's most renowned Renaissance artists, Gregório Lopes.
Chapel of Our Lady of the Conception (Nossa Senhora da Conceição): Chapel built between 1532 and 1540 in pure Renaissance style, begun by João de Castilho and finished by Diogo de Torralva. It was intended to be the burial chapel of King John III.
Church and Convent of Saint Iria: An early 16th century building located near the Nabão river.
 Museu dos Fosforos (Matchbox Museum) – The biggest private matchbox collection in Europe.
 Museu de Arte Moderna – Colecção José Augusto França (art gallery)
 Casa Museu Fernando Lopes Graça
 Casa dos Cubos (art gallery)

The streets and squares of the picturesque centre of Tomar are organised following a chessboard pattern, a rare feature for a mediaeval city, instituted by Prince Henry the Navigator, which later inspired the pattern used for the rebuilding of Lisbon after the earthquake in 1755. Scattered throughout the town there are many interesting houses with Renaissance, Baroque and Romantic façades. By the river Nabão, near the bridge, there is a park and garden that offer views of the city and surroundings.

Schools and education
Tomar has several schools including primary, junior high school, high schools and a polytechnic. These include:
 Escola do 1º Ciclo dos Templários –  primary school
 Escola do 1º Ciclo de Santo António – primary school
 Escola do 1º Ciclo de Infante D. Henrique – primary school
 Escola do Ensino Básico 2+3 Gualdim Pais – junior high school
 Escola do Ensino Básico 2+3 D. Nuno Álvares Pereira – junior high school, former high school and the oldest one in the town.
 Escola do Ensino Básico 2+3 de Santa Iria – junior high school
 Escola Secundária Santa Maria do Olival – high school
 Escola Secundária Jácome Ratton – high school
 Instituto Politécnico de Tomar – polytechnic

Local festival and events

 Festa dos Tabuleiros (Trays Festival), an ancient tradition in Tomar, is the most important festival celebrated in the city, attracting people from all over the world. The festival is held every four years, the last being held in June and July 2015. The local population parades in pairs with the girls carrying tabuleiros on their heads. The tabuleiro is made of 30 stacked pieces of bread, either in 6 rows of 5 or 5 rows of 6, decorated with flowers. At the top of the tabuleiro is a crown which normally contains either a white dove, symbolising the Holy Spirit, or the esfera armilar (armillary sphere), a symbol of the historical Portuguese maritime expansion.
 Festa de Santa Iria
 Nossa Senhora da Piedade (religious festival) - held on the first Sunday in September
 Festival Estatuas Vivas de Tomar
 Congress of Soups of Tomar
 Festival Bons Sons (Cem Soldos) - one of the most popular portuguese music festivals
 Festival Internacional de Tunas da Cidade de Tomar
 Tomarimbando - Festival de Percussão de Tomar
 Feira da Laranja Conventual
 Beer Fest of Tomar
 Summer fests in Tomar district – Serra Tomar is the largest one
 Remember PimPim (1980s music festival)
 Knights Templar Festival

Holidays 
The municipal holiday day is March 1, and commemorates the day when the Templars' Master D. Gualdim founded the Templar City in 1160.

Local food specialities 
 Fatias de Tomar
 Beija-me depressa (kiss me quickly) - Estrelas Confeitery

Myths 
It is rumored that Tomar hides the world's greatest templar treasure. (Maurice Guinguand, L'or des Templiers: Gisors ou Tomar?, 1973)
It is rumored that there is a secret passageway between the Santa Maria dos Olivais church and the Castle.
The Castle of Almourol nearby is where several bad events (deaths and tragic love stories) have taken place and is supposed to be haunted by a princess.

Sports

 União de Tomar – football
 Rugby Clube de Tomar – rugby
 Tenis Clube de Tomar – tennis
 Centro Hípico Quinta de Azinhais – hiking
 Sporting de Tomar – roller hockey
 SF Gualdim Pais – gymnastics, swimming
 Ginasio Clube de Tomar – gymnastics
 Associação Tomarense de Aviação Ultraligeira (ATAUL) – aviation
 AeroCalminhas – model aircraft flying
 Pantanal Club – Nutic modelism
 Associação de Natação do Distrito de Santarém (headquarters in Tomar) – swimming
 Motor Clube de Tomar – motocross and off-road
 Clube TT Minjoelho – off-road
 Automovel Clube de Tomar – car rallying
 Clube Amadores de Pesca de Tomar – fishing
 Clube de Caça e Pesca da Zona dos Templários – hunting and fishing
 CALMA, Clube de Actividades de Lazer e Manutenção – running and riding
 Clube Columbófilo Tomarense – Columbofilia
 Grupo Desportivo da Nabância – canoeing
 Aventura Templar - water sports, boat rental, sky, paintball, etc.
SCOCS (Sport Clube Operário Cem Soldos) – judo
 Equine Assisted Training – communication, leadership and management training with horses
 Volley – volleyball
 Volley de Praia – beach volleyball (this is played in a court with sand as Tomar is landlocked)

Notable people 

 Saint Irene of Tomar (c. 635 – c. 653), Christian martyr
 Angela Tamagnini (1770–1827), smallpox vaccination pioneer, resisted the French invasion during the Napoleonic Wars
 Fernando Tamagnini de Abreu e Silva (1856–1924), cavalry officer and general of the Portuguese Army
 Fernando Lopes-Graça (1906–1994), composer, conductor and musicologist
 Nuno Viriato Tavares de Melo Egídio (1922–2011), general and Governor of Macau
 Isabel Ruth (born 1940), actress
 João Henriques (born 1972), football manager
 Ana Laíns (born 1979), fado singer

Films shot in Tomar
 2015 Cinzas e Brasas, directed by Manuel Mozos,
2014 A Porta 21, directed by João Marco (with Mário Spencer, Pedro Monteiro, Pedro Viegas) 
 2011 Pão Nosso, documentary directed by Mónica Ferreira and João Luz
 2009 Juan de Castillo constructor del mundo, documentary directed by Alberto Luna Samperio (Etnocantabria)
 2009 La reine morte, directed by Pierre Boutron (with Michel Aumont, Gaëlle Bona, Thomas Jouannet)
 2007 '"Teresa, el cuerpo de Cristo, directed by Ray Loriga (with Paz Vega, Leonor Watling, Geraldine Chaplin, Eusebio Poncela)
 2007 Infante D. Henrique, documentary directed by José Francisco Pinheiro (with Gonçalo Cadilhe)
 2006 Coach Trip, TV series directed by Amanda Wood (with Brendan Sheerin, Andy Love)
 2005 Pedro e Inês, TV series (with Pedro Laginha, Ana Moreira, Nicolau Breyner)
 2004 O Quinto Império - Ontem Como Hoje, directed by Manoel de Oliveira (with Ricardo Trêpa, Luís Miguel Cintra, Glória de Matos)
 2003 Volpone, directed by Frédéric Auburtin (with Gérard Depardieu, Daniel Prévost, Gérard Jugnot, Robert Hirsch)
 2001 Quem És Tu?, directed by João Botelho (with Patrícia Guerreiro, Susana Borges, Rui Morisson, Rogério Samora, José Pinto, Francisco D'Orey e Bruno Martelo)
 1985 Atlântida: Do Outro Lado do Espelho, directed by Daniel Del Negro (with Luís Lucas, Teresa Madruga, Ruy de Carvalho)
 1922 A Sereia de Pedra'', directed by Roger Lion (scenes shot in June and July 1922 at the Convento de Cristo and Ruinas do Castelo dos Templarios)

See also
 Tomar IPR

References

External links

City Hall official website
The Synagogue of Tomar | The Museum of the Jewish People at Beit Hatfutsot

 
Populated places in Santarém District
1160 establishments in Europe
Municipalities of Santarém District
12th-century establishments in Portugal
Knights Templar